The 2023 season will be the Washington Commanders' upcoming 92nd season in the National Football League, their third under general manager Martin Mayhew and their fourth under head coach Ron Rivera. They will attempt to improve upon their 8–8–1 record from the previous year and return to the playoffs for the first time since 2020. 

The team replaced offensive coordinator Scott Turner, who originally joined the team alongside Rivera in 2020, with former Kansas City Chiefs offensive coordinator Eric Bieniemy, who was also named assistant head coach.

Draft

Staff

Roster

Schedule

Preseason
The Commanders' preseason opponents and schedule will be announced later.

Regular season
Listed below are the Commanders' opponents for 2023. Exact dates and times will be announced later.

References

External links
 

Washington
Washington Commanders seasons
Washington Commanders